Lubuk Paku is a small town in Maran District, Pahang, Malaysia. The town is located near Maran town. The main features of this town are the historical Lubuk Paku police station and Pahang River.

Historical Lubuk Paku police station
This historical police station was ambushed and destroyed by Dato' Bahaman, Tok Gajah and Mat Kilau followers during British protectorate in Pahang on early 19th century (1800).

References
Adopted from Kebangkitan di Pahang, Bab 7: Perjuangan Menentang Penjajah, Sejarah Tingkatan 2 textbook.

Maran District
Towns in Pahang